David Reidy (born 1993) is an Irish hurler who plays for Limerick Intermediate Championship club Dromin-Athlacca and at inter-county level with the Limerick senior hurling team. He usually lines out as a right wing-forward.

Playing career

Mary Immaculate College

During his studies at Mary Immaculate College, Reidy was selected for the college's senior hurling team during his second year. On 27 February 2016, he won a Fitzgibbon Cup medal when Mary Immaculate College won their first ever title after a 1-30 to 3-22 defeat of the University of Limerick.

Dromin-Athlacca

Reidy joined the Dromin-Athlacca club at a young age and played in all grades at juvenile and underage levels before eventually joining the club's top adult team in the Limerick Intermediate Championship.

On 15 October 2013, Reidy lined out at centre-forward when Dromin-Athlacca faced Knockaderry in the Limerick Intermediate Championship final. He scored 1-02, including a point from a free, and collected a winners' medal following a 2-18 to 1-15 victory.

On 27 October 2018, Reidy lined out in a second Limerick Intermediate Championship final. He top scored for Dromin-Athlacca with 0-09 and collected a second winners' medal following a 2-15 to 0-14 defeat of Croom.

Limerick

Minor and under-21

Reidy first played for Limerick as a member of the minor team during the 2011 Munster Championship. He made his first appearance for the team on 27 April 2011 when he lined out at right wing-forward in a 2-14 to 0-12 defeat of Cork.

Reidy was drafted onto the Limerick under-21 team for the 2013 Munster Championship. He made his only appearance in the grade on 31 May 2013 when he scored a point from left wing-forward in a 2-18 to 2-11 defeat by Tipperary.

Senior

Reidy was just 19-year-old when he was added to the Limerick panel for the 2013 National League. On 14 July 2013, he won a Munster Championship medal as a non-playing substitute following a 0-24 to 0-15 defeat of Cork in the Munster final.

On 23 February 2014, Reidy made his first appearance for the Limerick senior team when he came on as a 21st-minute substitute for Donal O'Grady and scored a goal in a 3-26 to 0-12 defeat of Antrim in the National League. On 3 July 2014, he was an unused substitute when Limerick suffered a 2-24 to 0-24 defeat by Cork in the Munster final.

Kildare

In January 2017, Reidy transferred to the Kildare senior hurling team. He made his first appearance for the team on 12 February 2017 and scored 0-06 in a 1-18 to 1-15 defeat of Armagh in the National League. Reidy ended the league as Kildare's top scorer with 2-42 in five games. He was also top scorer in Kildare's Christy Ring Cup campaign with 0-24.

Limerick return

In November 2017, it was announced that Reidy was returning to the Limerick senior hurling team. On 19 August 2018, he was an unused substitute when Limerick won their first All-Ireland title in 45 years after a 3-16 to 2-18 defeat of Galway in the final.

On 31 March 2019, Reidy was a member of the extended panel but failed to make the match-day panel when Limerick defeated Waterford by 1-24 to 0-19 to win the National League title. On 30 June 2019, he won a second Munster Championship medal after coming on as a substitute for Tom Morrissey in Limerick's 2-26 to 2-14 defeat of Tipperary in the final.

Career statistics

Honours

Mary Immaculate College
 Fitzgibbon Cup (1): 2016

Dromin-Athlacca
 Limerick Intermediate Hurling Championship (2): 2013, 2018

Limerick
 All-Ireland Senior Hurling Championship (3): 2018, 2020, 2021
 Munster Senior Hurling Championship (4): 2013, 2019, 2020, 2021
National Hurling League (2): 2019, 2020

References

1993 births
Living people
Dromin-Athlacca hurlers
Limerick inter-county hurlers
Kildare inter-county hurlers